Neill Lochery (born 1965) is a Scottish author and leading historian on the modern history of Europe and the Mediterranean Middle East.  He is a frequent contributor to newspapers and journal publications around the world.
Lochery is Professor of Middle Eastern and Mediterranean Studies at University College London.

Author 
He is the author of a series of critically acclaimed books. A number of his books focus on World War II.

His international bestseller, Lisbon: War in the Shadows in the City of Light, 1939-1945, recounts the pivotal role the Portuguese capital, Lisbon, played during World War II and how the small European country, guided by its authoritarian leader, António de Oliveira Salazar, survived the war not only physically intact but also significantly wealthier. The book is set within the context of a country that was frantically trying to hold on to its self-proclaimed wartime neutrality, but it was increasingly caught in the middle of the economic, and naval, wars between the Allies and the Axis.

In Brazil: The Fortunes of War, World War II and the Making of Modern Brazil, Lochery reveals a long-buried chapter of World War II, showing how the cunning statecraft and economic opportunism of Brazil's leaders, under the dictatorship of Getúlio Vargas, transformed it into a regional superpower and uncovers the little-known origins of one of the world’s emerging economic powerhouses.
In 2013, he completed the first volume of a major work on the modern history of Portugal; Outside Looking In, 1933-1974. It tells the stories of the colourful array of international personalities who came to Lisbon during the one of the most controversial periods in its modern history, the period of the Portuguese Estado Novo. In his book Out of the Shadows, Neill Lochery provides an engaging and insightful account of Portugal's first 40 years of democracy that started from the Carnation Revolution in 1974.

Lochery has additionally produced a series of books on the Middle East: The Resistible Rise of Benjamin Netanyahu (2016), Loaded Dice (2007), The View from the Fence (2005), Why Blame Israel (2004), The Difficult Road to Peace (1999) and The Israeli Labour Party (1997). The View from the Fence, was shortlisted for the 2006 Jewish Quarterly Wingate Prize and additionally featured in David Hare’s Broadway hit - The Wall.

Academic career 
Lochery has an MA from Exeter University, and a PhD from Durham University (Centre for Middle Eastern and Islamic Studies).

He joined University College London in 1997 and is now Professor of Middle Eastern and Mediterranean Studies in the faculty of Arts & Humanities.

Besides his ongoing research and teaching at University College London, in the past decade he has served as an advisor to several political leaders providing expert insight on current affairs of Europe and the Mediterranean Middle East. He also provides consultancy to companies on a broad range of topics: from risk assessments on the Middle East to more bespoke consultancy projects.

As well as giving a number of private and public seminars each year, he has op-ed and commentary articles published in The Wall Street Journal, The National Post (Canada), Jerusalem Post, The Scotsman, New York Sun, The Washington Post and United Press International.

Bibliography

Author
 Porto: Gateway to the World. London: Bloomsbury, 2020. 
 Out of the Shadows: Portugal from Revolution to the Present Day. London: Bloomsbury Books, 2017. 
 Benjamin Netanyahu. London: Bloomsbury Books, 2016. 
 Brazil: The Fortunes of War, World War II and the Making of Modern Brazil. New York: Basic Books, 2014.  - (Foreign language publication in Brazil and Portugal)
 Lisbon: Outside Looking In 1933 – present day (volume 1) Queluz de Baixo: Editorial Presenca, 2013. 
 Lisbon: War in the Shadows of the City of Light, 1939-1945. New York: Public Affairs, 2011.  - (Foreign language publication in Australia, New Zealand, Brazil, Poland, Portugal, Spain and Latin America as well as an award-winning audio release ) 
 Loaded Dice: The Foreign Office and Israel. London and New York: Continuum (Bloomsbury), 2007. 
 The View From The Fence. London and New York: Continuum (Bloomsbury), 2005. 
 Why Blame Israel? The Facts Behind the Headlines. Cambridge: Icon Books, 2004. 
 The Difficult Road to Peace. Netanyahu, Israel and the Middle East Peace Process. Reading: Ithaca Press, 1999. 
 The Israeli Labour Party: In the Shadow of the Likud. Reading: Ithaca Press, 1997.

Contributions
 World Powers: Diplomatic Alliances and International Relations beyond the Middle East: "Israel and Britain: Tipping the Scales of Balance". Shindler, C. (ed.). London and New York. IB Tauris, 2014. 
 The Middle East: Modern Controversies: "Creating a Palestinian State Would Not Resolve the Israeli-Palestinian Conflict". Ojeda, A. (ed.). Farmington Hills, MI: Greenhaven Press, 2003.

External links 
Neill Lochery official website: http://www.neill-lochery.co.uk/

References 

1965 births
Living people
Academics of the University of London
Alumni of Durham University
Alumni of the University of Exeter
20th-century Scottish historians
Scottish male writers